A screech is a high-pitched scream from an animal.

Screech may also mean:
Samuel "Screech" Powers, character played by Dustin Diamond in the NBC television sitcom Saved by the Bell
A mascot for numerous sports teams, including:
Screech (mascot), the Major League Baseball Washington Nationals
the mascot of the Quebec Major Junior Hockey League Cape Breton Screaming Eagles
Newfoundland Screech, a brand of rum from Newfoundland
"Screech Squad," the trumpet section of the Marching Chiefs of Florida State University
Screech (comics), an armored vigilante in Marvel comics

People with the surname

 Michael Andrew Screech (1926-2018), a cleric and a professor of French literature
 Roy Screech (born 1953), English bishop
 Timon Screech (born 1961), an academic of the University of London (School of Oriental and African Studies)